The Sukhoi Su-17 (Aircraft R) was a prototype Soviet fighter. The name was later reused for an entirely different fighter-bomber, see Sukhoi Su-17.

Development
The Su-17 was designed to closely match the theoretical TsAGI calculations for supersonic performance. The aircraft had a 50° swept wing fitted with air brakes and boosted controls. A unique feature was that in addition to an ejection seat, the entire nose section of the aircraft could separate from the rest of the airframe. The project was canceled with no flights due to problems with wing structure, ongoing difficulties with the development of the TR-3 engine, and the closure of the Sukhoi OKB. The only example was eventually used as a gunfire target.

Specifications (Su-17 interceptor)

References

Su-17 (1949)
1940s Soviet fighter aircraft
Abandoned military aircraft projects of the Soviet Union